Irena Novotná-Česneková (born 2 May 1972) is a Czech biathlete. She competed at the 1994, 1998, 2002 and the 2002 Winter Olympics.

References

1972 births
Living people
Biathletes at the 1994 Winter Olympics
Biathletes at the 1998 Winter Olympics
Biathletes at the 2002 Winter Olympics
Biathletes at the 2006 Winter Olympics
Czech female biathletes
Olympic biathletes of the Czech Republic
Sportspeople from Třebíč